Ekta Jeev  Sadashiv is 1972 Marathi film directed by Govind Kulkarni and starring Dada Kondke and Usha Chavan as leads. It was  remade in Hindi as Jis Desh Mein Ganga Rehta Hain which was released in 2000. The core plot of the 1974 Kannada movie Bangaarada Panjara was thematically similar to this movie since it was also based on the Marathi play Ekta Jeev  Sadashiv.

Plot
Sadashiv (Dada Kondke), the infant son of a poor family, has an unspecified childhood illness. For reasons of health, Sadashiv's family sends him away from the city to live in a country village. There he is  raised by a simple couple whom he regards as his parents. When he becomes a young man, he falls in love with a village girl Usha Chavan. When the time comes for Sadashiv to marry, his parents inform him that his biological parents live in the city and want him to settle there. Sadashiv bids a tearful farewell to his village and its inhabitants. He travels to the city of his birth parents. The rest of the movie presents the young man's comic struggle to adjust to city life, its corruption, and its hypocrisy.

Cast
Dada Kondke
Usha Chavan
Ratnamala

Soundtrack

References

Films set in Mumbai
Indian comedy films
1972 films
1970s Marathi-language films
Marathi films remade in other languages
1972 comedy films